Seemanta Engineering College (also known as SEC), Mayurbhanj is one of the oldest private engineering colleges in the northern part of state Odisha, India. SEC founded in 1997 as a sister institute of Seemanta Mahavidyalaya Samiti which was founded by Mr Paresh Chandra Basa in the year 1978. The institute has courses in disciplines such as Mechanical, Civil, Computer Science, Electronics and Telecommunication, Electronics and Instrumentation and Electrical.

The college is affiliated to the Biju Patnaik University of Technology and has been approved by AICTE (All India Council for Technical Education).

History
SEC was established on 1997 as a project of the Seemanta Mahavidyalaya Samiti to provide technical education to North Orissa and the bordering regions of Jharkhand and West Bengal. The institute started with first batch of students from 3 disciplines such as Computer Science, Mechanical and  Electronics & Telecommunication. Initially the classes were conducted on Seemanta Institute of Pharmaceutical Sciences building whereas practicals were conducted on Seemanta ITI and Seemanta Mahavidyalaya. From 1999 onwards SEC has had its own building at Mayurvihar which is 4 km from Jarpokharia, Baripada, Mayurbhanj.

Academic profile

References

External links 
 Seemanta Engineering College

Private engineering colleges in India
Engineering colleges in Odisha
Colleges affiliated with Biju Patnaik University of Technology
All India Council for Technical Education
Mayurbhanj district
Educational institutions established in 1997
1997 establishments in Orissa